In-a-Minute Records was a record company founded in 1991 by Jason Blaine. It featured many artists from the underground bay area rap scene including RBL Posse, Andre Nickatina, I.M.P, Pooh-Man, Totally Insane. The label was shut down in 2000.

Origins and early formation

The label was founded in 1991 in Oakland, California, by Jason Blaine, who was disappointed by the fact that many rappers in the Bay Area were unsigned at the time. He offered RBL Posse $10,000 ahead of time to sign with his label, which they quickly accepted due to the fact that they were still selling tapes on the street.  Although the label never had any major commercially successful albums, Andre Nickatina's 1995 album I Hate You with a Passion appeared at #79 on the Billboard Top R&B/Hip-Hop Albums chart and #3 on the Billboard Heatseekers chart.

Former artists
Andre Nickatina (1992–1995)
Rappin' 4-Tay (1991)
Totally Insane (1991–1995)
RBL Posse (1992–1994)
Pooh-Man (1992–1995)
Dogg Pound Posse (1993)
Too Short (1993)
Just-Ice (1995)
Mac Mill (1995)
West Coast Rhyme Sayrz (1995–1996)
Master P (1991–1992)
TRU (1991–1993) 
Rally Ral (1993)
Sonya C (1991–1993)
Hugh E.M.C. (1993)
I.M.P (1993–1996)

Releases

References

American independent record labels
Gangsta rap record labels
Hip hop record labels
Record labels based in California